Biggle or Biggles may refer to:

Biggle
 Lloyd Biggle, Jr. (1923–2002), American musician, author and oral historian

Biggles
 Biggles, James Bigglesworth, fictional pilot and adventurer created by W. E. Johns
 Biggles (film), 1986 sci-fi adventure film, incorporating the Biggles character created by W. E. Johns
 Doctor Biggles-Jones, fictional character from the G.I. Joe and Transformers fictional universe as seen in Marvel Comics
 Biggles, Ontario
 Carl Barât, an English musician known for Dirty Pretty Things and The Libertines, nicknamed 'Biggles' by Peter Doherty
 The Biggles, Billy and Ruby Biggle, the main characters of the Kidsongs videos and TV show

See also
 Boggle (disambiguation)